Fibronectin leucine rich transmembrane protein 1 is a protein that in humans is encoded by the FLRT1 gene.

Function

This gene encodes a member of the fibronectin leucine rich transmembrane protein (FLRT) family. The family members may function in cell adhesion and/or receptor signalling. Their protein structures resemble small leucine-rich proteoglycans found in the extracellular matrix. The encoded protein shares sequence similarity with two other family members, FLRT2 and FLRT3. This gene is expressed in the kidney and brain.

References

Further reading